Wara Buland Khan is a small village near Khewra Town in Jehlum tehsil Pind Dadan Khan Punjab, Pakistan. The village is situated approximately 5 kilometres (3.1 mi) Northwest of Pind Dadan Khan on Choa Sedan Shah-Pind Dadan Khan road. The largest caste is Awan. First, this village was discovered by Buland Khan who came with his Flock of sheep from north Punjab. In Urdu Wara (واڑہ ) means flock so the place name became popular within people Wara Buland Khan (Flock of Buland Khan). Buland Khan owns most land of the village so he became the first Malik of Wara Buland Khan.

Since 1947, Chakwal was a part of District Jehlum. In 1985, Jehlum became a district with four tehsils. The district is administratively subdivided into four tehsils: Tehsil Jehlum, Tehsil Dina, Sohawa Tehsil, and Pind Dadan Khan Tehsil.  It is located 90 km south-east of the federal capital, Islamabad.

Facilities
There is a Jamia Mosque in the centre of the village. In recent census population of Wara Buland Khan is 1368. A government Primary school for boys and girls is also located here.

References

Union councils of Jhelum District
Populated places in Jhelum District